The broad-headed snake (Hoplocephalus bungaroides) is a species of venomous snake in the family Elapidae. The species is restricted to the Sydney Basin in New South Wales, Australia. It is one of three snakes in the genus Hoplocephalus, all restricted to eastern Australia. It is currently endangered in New South Wales and is listed as vulnerable under the Commonwealth Legislation.

Taxonomy
German naturalist Hermann Schlegel described the species in 1837 as Naja bungaroides.

Description

It is black with numerous irregular yellow markings arranged in narrow cross-bands, which for inexperienced people can easily lead to confusion with a young diamond python, which is superficially very similar and found in the same habitat.

Distribution and habitat
The broad-headed snake is found in the Sydney Basin in New South Wales, Australia. The snake's choice of habitat depends on temperature, age, gender, and breeding status. In the colder months, adult and juvenile snakes reside in the crevices of sandstone outcrops on exposed cliff edges to maximise warmth from the sun. When the temperature rises in spring, adult males and non-breeding females move to adjacent woodlands and forests, inhabiting hollow trees during the summer months. Juvenile snakes and gravid females remain in the rocks and move to cooler, shaded areas.

Their habitat has been degraded by urbanization, illegal rock removal, vandalisation and indiscriminate reptile collecting. The sandstone rocks that the snakes occupy are valued for landscaping purposes. Their removal has led to a loss of habitat for both the snakes and their prey.

Behavior

Diet
The broad-headed snake feeds infrequently on small reptiles and mammals. Snakes in captivity are able to maintain or gain weight when fed one to two newborn rats per month. In one documented case, a snake survived a fast lasting twelve months.

Juveniles feed mostly on Lesueur's velvet gecko (Amalosia lesueurii) and occasionally on small skinks. Adults feed on Lesueur's velvet gecko, but also prey on other lizards, small snakes, and mice.

Breeding
Male broad-headed snakes reach maturity after five years whereas females require six. Mating occurs from autumn to spring, and mature females produce a litter every two years. Unlike most of its venomous counterparts, the broad-headed snake gives birth to live young. Birth occurs between January and April, with each litter resulting in 4–12 offspring born in mucous sacks. Unfertilized oocytes and stillborn offspring are common.

Conservation status
The broad-headed snake was once commonly found in parts of Sydney including around Sydney Harbour; however, it is currently listed as an endangered species in New South Wales and vulnerable under the national Commonwealth Legislation. Its declining numbers are the result of a combination of factors including habitat loss through urbanisation, bush rock removal and irresponsible collecting.

Sources
Wildlife of Sydney Fact File
DEH Species Profiles - Hoplocephalus bungaroides - Broad-headed Snake

References

Further reading
Cogger HG (2014). Reptiles and Amphibians of Australia, Seventh Edition. Clayton, Victoria, Australia: CSIRO Publishing. xxx + 1,033 pp. .
Wilson S, Swan G (2013). A Complete Guide to Reptiles of Australia, Fourth Edition. Sydney: New Holland Publishers. 522 pp. .

Reptiles of New South Wales
Hoplocephalus
Vulnerable fauna of Australia
Reptiles described in 1837